Dilna is a village located in Baramulla town of Baramulla district, Jammu and Kashmir with total population of 7599 of which 3835 are males while 3764 are females as per Census 2011.

References 

Villages in Baramulla district